El Tayib or El Taib is a surname of Arabic origin. Notable people with the surname include:

Abdullah El Tayib
Griselda El Tayib
Tarik El Taib

See also

Arabic-language surnames